Michael Andrew Law (Chinese: 羅卓睿;born Law Cheuk Yui November 13, 1982 in Hong Kong) is a Hong Kong contemporary artist, painter, film producer, which aims to reduce the epidemic of trauma and toxic stress among at-risk populations everywhere. The exhibition included oil painted portraits of Maharishi Mahesh Yogi, president John Hagelin, filmmaker David Lynch, professor Fred Travis, and Bob Roth, chief executive of the David Lynch Foundation.

Multimedia work
Law also known for his work as film producer. He produced and directed a dozen promotional music videos and two documentaries films with his own production group in Hong Kong.

Chronology

 2013 Exhibition at NatureArt Gallery DeTour 2013
 2009 Exhibition The Avenue of Stars
 2007 Guest and ExhibitionThe Peak Galleria Hong Kong
 2007 Invited workshop exhibition, Elements, Hong Kong
 2006 Collection by Cardinal Zen Ze-kiun and exhibited at Catholic Church of Hong Kong
 2004 - 2007, Exhibition, Hong Kong Central Library
 2005 illustrator for Kung Kao Po
 2004 Group Exhibition, Wanchai Tower
 2003 Group Exhibition, Hong Kong Convention and Exhibition Centre.
 2003  Winner of I luv Hong Kong Painting Competition, exhibition at The Landmark (Hong Kong).

Selected publications

  China: Contemporary Painting
  International Contemporary Painting
  Traditional & Contemporary Chinese Brush
  A Tradition Redefined: Modern and Contemporary Chinese Ink Paintings from the Chu-tsing Li Collection
  Michael Andrew Law Pale Hair Girls Catalogue (Volume 1), 2014 Cheukyui Law, Michael Andrew Law, exhibition catalogue,
  iEgoism Paperback, 2015 Michael Andrew Law,Publisher: XLibris Eassay,
  Chinese Contemporary Artist Full Coloured Edition Michael Andrew Law Studio,  Michael Andrew Law, Hong Kong Art Basel, Michael Andrew Law Studio,
  Christmas Everyday Michael Andrew Law Studio, Michael Andrew Law ,Studio Cheukyui, Florence Lawman Christmas Everyday,
  Conceptz on woods, 2015Michael Andrew Law Exhibition Catalogue , Studio Cheukyui, Los AngelesMichael Andrew Law, Michael Andrew Law – Conceptz on woods
  iEgoism Paintings, 2015Michael Andrew Law Exhibition Catalogue Volume 3, Studio Cheukyui, Los AngelesMichael Andrew Law, Michael Andrew Law – iEgoism Paintings

See also
 Roman Catholic Diocese of Hong Kong

References

External links

Official website
The fine art america website
Artist Blog

1982 births
Living people
Chinese contemporary artists
Hong Kong painters
Photorealist artists